Live at Isstadion Stockholm: Wild Frontier Tour is a 1987 live video by hard rock guitarist Gary Moore, recorded live on 25 April 1987 at Isstadion, Stockholm, Sweden, during the tour in support of the album Wild Frontier. The sound track was recorded and mixed by Nigel Walker. The tour had the valuable contribution of drummer Eric Singer, who recently had left Black Sabbath.

Tracks 
"Over the Hills and Far Away" (Gary Moore)
"Thunder Rising" (Moore, Neil Carter)
"Wild Frontier" (Moore)
"Military Man" (Phil Lynott)
"Empty Rooms" (Moore, Carter)
"All Messed Up" (Moore, Carter)
"Out in the Fields" (Moore)
"Rockin' Every Night" (Moore, Paice)
"The Loner" (Max Middleton, Moore)

Personnel 
Gary Moore – lead guitar, lead vocals
Neil Carter – keyboards, rhythm guitar, backing and lead vocals
Bob Daisley – bass
Eric Singer – drums

References

Live video albums
1987 video albums
Virgin Records video albums
Gary Moore live albums